The Frederiksværk Line is a  long standard gauge single track local passenger railway line in North Zealand, Denmark. It runs between Hillerød and Hundested. The name Frederiksværkbanen refers to the town Frederiksværk between Hillerød and Hundested.

The section from Hillerød to Frederiksværk opened in 1897, and the section from Frederiksværk to Hundested in 1916. The railway is currently owned by Hovedstadens Lokalbaner and operated by the railway company Lokaltog. Lokaltog runs frequent local train services from Hillerød station to Hundested station with most trains continuing from Hundested station to Hundested Harbour station to connect with the ferry to Rørvig in Odsherred.

See also
 List of railway lines in Denmark

References

External links

 Lokaltog

Hovedstadens Lokalbaner
Railway lines in Denmark
Railway lines opened in 1897
Railway lines opened in 1916
Rail transport in the Capital Region of Denmark